Mudplaning is the loss of traction of a wheel when the pavement is covered by a very thin layer of sand and waste oils. It may occur during the first rainfall (or through other means of dampening) on a specific area which has been dry for a period of time. When the rain first falls down, the thin layer of dust mixes with waste oils and turns into a nearly transparent layer of grease. The color of asphalt remains as usual while the underlying mixture may still cause a critical loss of traction comparable to that of driving on rime ice. When the rain totally washes the pavement off the grease, the effects of mudplaning will be mitigated. The whole phenomenon is similar to the formation of black ice which has been responsible for many unavoidable accidents on highways.

To avoid mudplaning, a driver has to check whether the road is taking its first rain after a prolonged drought. This can be done by looking at weather reports of that specific area and evaluating its geographic structure. If the driver is suspicious of the hazard, it would be an option to stop the vehicle and check the tires for artifacts of dust. If the tires are getting dirty with no visible sign of the road being so, then the road may pose a mudplaning hazard. It is advisable to wait for the rain to totally remove the greasy dust on the pavement before resuming the trip.

See also
Traction (engineering)

References
 Wielerklassieker Verslag - Een nieuw fenomeen “mudplaning”

Tires